Mario Nakić (born June 14, 2001) is a Serbian-Croatian professional basketball player for Igokea of the ABA League.

Early life and career
Nakić was born in Belgrade, Serbia, FR Yugoslavia to a Croatian father and a Serbian mother. His father is Ivo Nakić, a former Croatian professional basketball player. His mother is Zorica Desnica. Nakić's older half-brother is Filip Živojinović, a son of Serbian former tennis player Slobodan Živojinović.

He started his basketball career with the youth team of Zemun where he played until 2014. In the 2014–15 season, Nakić played with the youth selection of Serbian powerhouse Partizan. He moved to the Real Madrid's youth team one year later, for the 2015–16 season. He was selected to the all-tournament team for the 2017–18 season of the Next Generation Tournament. Nakić was a member of the Real Madrid U18 team that won the Next Generation Tournament in the 2018–19 season. He was named the MVP and selected to the all-tournament team after helping defeat Mega Bemax Belgrade in the final. He set championship game records with 33 points and a performance index rating of 41.

Professional career
On May 24, 2018, Nakić made a debut with Real Madrid in the Liga ACB (the top-tier Spanish League). He scored two points in a Real Madrid's 2017–18 season loss from Herbalife Gran Canaria.

Following the 2020–21 season Nakić declared himself for the 2021 NBA draft. On July 19, 2021, he withdrawn his name from consideration for the 2021 NBA draft.
 
On August 3, 2021, he has signed with MoraBanc Andorra of the Liga ACB. Previously declared, Nakić subsequently withdrawn his name from consideration for the 2022 NBA draft.

On 16 August 2022, Nakić  signed a 3-year contract with Igokea of the ABA League.

National team career
Nakić is eligible to play for either Croatia or Serbia. In May 2019, the Croatian head coach Veljko Mršić stated that Nakić has not decided anything yet, but he is closer to play for Serbia. That was followed by confirmation of the Basketball Federation of Serbia Vice president Igor Rakočević. In the end, the Serbian head coach Aleksandar Đorđević confirmed that Nakić has not decided anything yet. In September 2022, Nakić stated that there is no decision yet which nation team he will represent.

Career achievements and awards 
 EB Next Generation Tournament MVP (2019)
 2× All-EB Next Generation Tournament Team (2018, 2019)

Career statistics

EuroLeague

|-
| style="text-align=left;"| 2019–20
| style="text-align-left;"| Real Madrid
| 3 || 1 || 3:58 || .750 || — || .000 || .7 || .0 || .3 || .0 || 2.0 || 1.3
|-

References

External links

Mario Nakić at EuroLeague
Mario Nakić at realgm.com
Mario Nakić at acb.com
Mario Nakić at eurospects.com

2001 births
Living people
Basketball players from Belgrade
BC Andorra players
BC Oostende players
Croatian expatriate basketball people in Spain
Croatian men's basketball players
Croatian people of Serbian descent
Liga ACB players
Real Madrid Baloncesto players
Serbian expatriate basketball people in Andorra
Serbian expatriate basketball people in Belgium
Serbian expatriate basketball people in Spain
Serbian men's basketball players
Serbian people of Croatian descent
Small forwards